Robert Patrick Oakden (9 May 1938 – 20 July 2011) was an English cricketer.  Oakden was a right-handed batsman who bowled right-arm fast-medium.  He was born at Kirkby-in-Ashfield, Nottinghamshire, and was educated at Newark
Magnus Grammar School.

Oakden made his first-class debut for Nottinghamshire against Lancashire in the 1960 County Championship.  He made seven further first-class appearances for the county, the last of which came against Hampshire in the 1961 County Championship.  In his eight first-class appearances for the county, he took 17 wickets at an average of 42.82, with best figures of 4/78.  With the bat, he scored 68 runs at a batting average of 9.71, with a high score of 24.

Outside of cricket, Oakden completed his National Service in the Royal Navy, during which he had served aboard .  Following his first-class cricket career, Oakden played golf to a high standard, becoming the first person to represent Nottinghamshire at both cricket and golf since World War II.  He died at the town of his birth on 20 July 2011.

References

External links
Patrick Oakden at ESPNcricinfo
Patrick Oakden at CricketArchive

1938 births
2011 deaths
English cricketers
Nottinghamshire cricketers
People educated at Magnus Church of England School
People from Kirkby-in-Ashfield
Cricketers from Nottinghamshire